Robyn Dell'Unto is a singer, songwriter and producer from Toronto, Ontario.

Career 
Dell'Unto's debut album I'm Here Every Night was released in 2010 on inDiscover/Orange Record Label. Her song Ghost was featured in the Season 2 Finale of CBC's hit show Being Erica.  Single Just A Bird charted in the Top 10 on South Africa's Algoa FM for 30 weeks.

Dell'Unto's sophomore album Little Lines was her first release as producer/co-producer. She now writes and produces for other artists.

She received a nomination for Best Emerging Artist at the 2014 Canadian Folk Music Awards.

Other Work 
Dell'Unto runs A Song Of My Own, a songwriting and music production workshop series for girls.

Discography 
I'm Here Every Night (2010)
Little Lines (2014) 
Beaconsfield (2017)

Singles 
Call Me (2016)

References

Canadian women singers
Living people
Canadian Film Centre alumni
Year of birth missing (living people)